SS John Bascom was a Liberty ship built in the United States during World War II. She was named after John Bascom, a professor of rhetoric at Williams College from 1855 to 1874, and the president of the University of Wisconsin from 1874 to 1887.

Construction
John Bascom was laid down on 7 September 1942, under a Maritime Commission (MARCOM) contract, MC hull 1521, by J.A. Jones Construction, Panama City, Florida; she was sponsored by Mrs. Harry G. Fannin, the wife of the mayor of Panama City, she was launched on 31 March 1943.

History
She was allocated to Moore-McCormack Lines, Inc., on 30 April 1943. On 2 December 1943, she was sunk during the German air raid on Bari, Italy.

Awards
Captain Otto Heitmann, Master of John Bascom was given the Merchant Marine Distinguished Service Medal by The President of the United States. With disregard to his painful injuries he aided and comforted his crew.
Allen G. Collins, Third Mate on John Bascom was given the Merchant Marine Distinguished Service Medal by The President of the United States. Collins showed great courage and his self-sacrificing to aid his shipmates. John Bascom was attacked in the harbor of Bari, Italy. Around exploding and sinking ship that caused fire on John Bascoms deck with strafing enemy planes, Collins continued his gun crew until seriously wounded by a bomb. Wounded, he assisted other men to lifeboats, helped lower the boat, manned an oar for the trip to the breakwater and assisted in dragging three additional injured men from the flaming oil covered waters of the harbor. Several days later he died in a local hospital as a result of the injuries he had incurred.

References

Bibliography

 
 
 
 

 

Liberty ships
Ships built in Panama City, Florida
1943 ships
Ships sunk by aircraft during the air raid on Bari
Maritime incidents in December 1943